The Polish Football Association ( PZPN) is the governing body of association football in Poland. It organizes the Polish football leagues (without the Ekstraklasa), the Polish Cup and the Poland national football team. It is based in the Polish capital of Warsaw.

History 
The fully independent federation was established 20 December 1919 engulfing the autonomous Polish Football Union (PFU) that was part of the disintegrated Austrian Football Union. The PFU was established on 25 June 1911 in Lwów, Austria-Hungary. Between 1911 and 1919 the national team of Poland played three games at the Czarni Lwów's stadium. The team was composed mainly of players from the city of Lwów.

When the Wehrmacht invaded Poland in September 1939, all Polish institutions and associations were dissolved, including the PZPN. The German occupying forces forbade Poles to organise football matches.

In September 2008, the leadership of the PZPN was suspended by the Polish Olympic Committee for "[violating] its statutes in a continuous and flagrant fashion." A year earlier, the Polish sports ministry also made an attempt to address corruption within the PZPN, but was threatened with suspension by FIFA, which forbids any form of government intervention. On 30 October 2008, Grzegorz Lato became the president of the PZPN. On 26 October 2012, Zbigniew Boniek was elected president after winning 61 votes from 118 delegates.

The football association turned 100 years with the 2019 FIFA U-20 World Cup during its centennial year. In 2019, Józef Klotz, who had played for the Poland national football team and was killed in the Warsaw Ghetto during the Holocaust, was honored by the Association.

On 28 August 2021, Cezary Kulesza was elected president.

Presidents

References

External links 

 Official website 
 Poland at FIFA site 
 Poland at UEFA site 

Poland
Football in Poland
Futsal in Poland
Football
1919 establishments in Poland
Sports organizations established in 1919